Lafoeina is a genus of hydrozoans belonging to the family Campanulinidae.

The genus has cosmopolitan distribution.

Species:

Lafoeina longitheca 
Lafoeina maxima 
Lafoeina tenuis

References

Campanulinidae
Hydrozoan genera